Adarsh Vidya Mandir is a private higher senior Secondary school situated in Bokaro, Jharkhand, India. The school management is run by Marwari Panchayat, Chas Bokaro. This school follows the education patterns set by the Central Board of Secondary Education, New Delhi. The school prepares students with an approach by focusing on imparting skill based learning, based on 10+2 pattern of instruction of Central Board of Secondary Education . The school offers facilities for Science and Commerce streams to senior secondary students . They are endowed with obligatory as well as supplementary theoretical and practical assistance to achieve excellence in board examination. The school is located in very traffic area.

History 
In 1970, Marwari Panchayat started Adarsh Vidya Mandir in Chas with only a few students in a small classroom and a handful of teachers. With time the school earned popularity and became a good institution in Bokaro. From 1970 to 1991 it emphasized on the upper primary classes. The institution was affiliated by CBSE, New Delhi in the year 1992 up to the secondary level. Thereafter, it also affiliated by CBSE, New Delhi up to senior secondary level.

See also 
 Bokaro Public School
DAV Public School, Sector IV

References 

Private schools in Jharkhand
Education in Bokaro Steel City